Peekskill Hollow Creek is a creek in central western Putnam County, New York, mainly in the town of Putnam Valley.  Approximately  in length, it originate as the outflow of Lake Tibet in the southwestern part of the town of Kent and flows southwest towards the town of Peekskill in farthest northwest Westchester County.  For several miles after leaving Kent it serves as the border between the towns of Carmel and Putnam Valley.

Upon leaving Putnam Valley it enters the town of Cortlandt in Westchester County. Approaching the Hudson River it joins the confluence of two much smaller streams, the Sprout Brook and Annsville Creek, named after the latter, by which name all three enter the river after less than a mile.

In Colonial times and beyond, before Putnam County's topography was well understood and its features given names, it was thought by some that Peekskill Hollow Creek's headwaters drained from what is today's Boyds Corner Reservoir in the town of Kent one mile to Lake Tibet's east.  Instead, it drains eastward into the Croton River watershed, part of the New York City water supply system.

External links
NewYork.hometownlocator.com
 

Rivers of Putnam County, New York
Rivers of New York (state)
Tributaries of the Hudson River